Gan Sorek (lit. Sorek Garden) is a moshav in central Israel. Located in the coastal plain around four kilometres south-west of Rishon LeZion and covering 700 dunams, it falls under the jurisdiction of Gan Raveh Regional Council.

History
The moshav was founded in 1950 by Jewish immigrants from Poland and Romania on the land of the depopulated Palestinian   village of Nabi Rubin, and was named after the nearby Nahal Sorek.

References

Moshavim
Populated places established in 1950
Populated places in Central District (Israel)
Polish-Jewish culture in Israel
Romanian-Jewish culture in Israel
1950 establishments in Israel